Marianna may refer to:

 Marianna, Arkansas, USA
 Marianna, Florida, USA
 Marianna, Pennsylvania, USA
 An English spelling for Mariana, Minas Gerais, Brazil
 602 Marianna, an asteroid, number 602 in the minor planet catalog
 Marianna (given name), with a list of people of this name

See also
Marianne (given name)
Mariana (name)
Maria Anna (disambiguation)
Mariano
Marian (given name)
Marian (surname)